Phryganeoidea is a giant caddisfly superfamily that may be paraphyletic with Limnephiloidea.

References 

Insect superfamilies
Integripalpia